The American Hellenic Educational Progressive Association (AHEPA, usually referred to as the Order of AHEPA) is a fraternal organization founded on July 26, 1922, in Atlanta, Georgia. AHEPA was founded to fight for civil rights and against discrimination, bigotry, and hatred felt at the hands of the Ku Klux Klan. It is the largest and oldest grassroots association of American citizens of Greek heritage and Philhellenes with more than 400 chapters across the United States, Canada, Australia, and Europe.

The mission of AHEPA is to promote the ancient Hellenic ideals of education, philanthropy, civic responsibility, family and individual excellence through community service and volunteerism.

History 

The AHEPA was founded as a fraternity in Atlanta, Georgia, on July 26, 1922.  Its initial mission was to promote the image of Greeks in America, assist them with citizenship and assimilation into American culture, and combat prejudice. During that inaugural meeting, it was decided that AHEPA's purposes would be:
 
(a) To advance and promote pure and undefiled Americanism among the Greeks of the United States, its Territories and Colonial possessions; 
(b) To educate the Greeks in the matter of democracy, and in the matter of the government of the United States; 
(c) To instill the deepest loyalty to the United States; 
(d) To promote fraternal sociability; 
(e) To practice benevolent aid among this nationality.

With the full assimilation of Greek Americans, its mission evolved toward philanthropy, education, and promoting and preserving the Hellenic identity of the Greek Americans and the ethnic Greeks of other countries where AHEPA is present, such as Australia, Canada, the Bahamas as well as Greece and Cyprus. In recent years, AHEPA has also expanded to other countries in Europe, besides Greece and Cyprus, including Austria, Belgium, France, Germany, Netherlands and UK.

The founders of the fraternity were eight men, all residents of Atlanta, who conceived the idea of the establishment of an association of mainly citizens of Greek descent, although not limited only to such members. The eight founders of the Order of AHEPA, who were also the members of the first Supreme Lodge of the organization, were Nicholas D. Chotas, James Campbell, Spiro J. Stamos, Harry Angelopoulos, George A. Polos, John Angelopoulos, George Campbell, James Vlass.

Franklin D. Roosevelt was initiated into the Delphi Chapter on March 11, 1931, and was an active dues-paying member for 14 years, to the time of his death.

The office of Supreme President is the highest office in the Order of AHEPA. There have been 71 Supreme Presidents since the founding of the organization on July 26, 1922.

Past Supreme Presidents

Organization 

Originally AHEPA was organized on a lodge system like that of the Masons or Oddfellows. Local units were called "Subordinate Lodges" and state or territory structures were called "Superior Lodges". Now local groups are called "Chapters" and regional organizations are called "Districts". The national structure is still called the "Supreme Lodge", however, and all of its officers have "Supreme" in their title such as Supreme President, Supreme Treasurer etc.

The Order of AHEPA has over 400 chapters across the United States, Canada, and Europe. In addition, the chapters report to 28 different districts. Those 28 districts report to the Supreme Lodge and Headquarters located in Washington, DC.

Membership 

Originally, membership was restricted to only Greeks. At its third meeting, the Order decided to change this, allowing non-Greeks to join. In 1979, AHEPA had over 25,000 members in 400 chapters. By 1989, the number climbed to 60,000, despite an overall decline in memberships of fraternal groups during this period.

There have been 540 chapters chartered in the United States, 16 chartered in Canada, 30 chartered in Greece, 5 chartered in Cyprus, and 10 chartered in Europe. There are "sister" chapters in AHEPA Australasia (Australia and New Zealand). An estimated 500,000 men have been inducted into the Order of AHEPA over its 90-year history.

Supreme Convention
"In accordance with the provisions of the AHEPA Constitution, the Supreme Convention of the Order of AHEPA shall be the highest constituted body of the entire AHEPA; it shall remain in session until it is adjourned by a majority of its members; its powers over the entire Order shall be limited only by the AHEPA Constitution and the AHEPA BYLAWS, over which it shall have the exclusive power to alter; and it shall consist, in its composite whole, of the Voting Members of the Convention.

The Supreme Convention has the authority to overturn, overrule, reject or rescind decisions of the Supreme Counselor, Board of Trustees or Supreme Lodge, including the authority to reject, rescind or terminate contracts after the consequences of such action is explained to them. Any such decision of the Supreme Convention to overturn, overrule, reject or rescind any decision of Supreme Counselor, Board of Trustees or Supreme Lodge can be made by a majority vote of the registered Voting Members of the Convention then present and voting at the time as long as those voting in favor represent at least a majority of the Voting Members of the Convention duly registered at such Convention."

Politics 
AHEPA has taken a stand on the Cyprus issue since 1955 when it formed the "Justice for Cyprus" committee to support Cyprus' independence. Through the decades, the organization has continued advocate on issues relating to Greece and Cyprus in Washington, while also educating the public about these topics.
 Congressional scorecard
For each Congress, AHEPA compiles a Congressional scorecard on issues of importance to the American Hellenic community and to the organization.  The purpose of the scorecard is to educate AHEPA's membership and the community on how engaged members of Congress are on these issues, or at the least, their level of awareness.

Awards

AHEPA recognizes distinguished achievements in various categories such as Public Service, Government, Law, Business, Journalism, Science, the Arts, Military Service, Humanitarian. Below is a list of AHEPA awards and recipients over the years.

Socrates Awards
The Socrates Award recognizes prominent men and women who have emulated ancient Hellenic ideals. This is the most prestigious award AHEPA awards.

AHEPA's premier social event, the AHEPA National Banquet, was held for the first time on February 26, 1929, at the Willard Hotel in Washington, DC. In 1948, the name of the event was changed to the "AHEPA Congressional Banquet" and for the first time, a United States President, Harry Truman, attended. In 2000 AHEPA reverted to a more appropriate name of this event, The AHEPA Biennial Banquet.

Since 1964, the AHEPA National Banquet has also featured presentations of the organization's most coveted honor, the Socrates Award.

A list of past recipients of the Socrates Award:
 Henry R. Luce – 1964 – Publisher of Time and Life magazines
 Lyndon B. Johnson – 1966 – President of the United States of America
 Everett Dirksen – 1968 – Senator from Illinois
 Spiro T. Agnew – 1970 – Vice-president of the United States of America
 Richard M. Nixon – 1971 – President of the United States of America
 Holiness Athenagoras I Ecumenical Patriarch – 1972
 The U.S. Senate and U.S. House of Representatives – 1976
 Hubert H. Humphrey – 1978 – Vice-president of the United States of America
 Claiborne Pell – 1982 – Senator from Connecticut
 Bob Hope – 1984 – Entertainer
 Ronald Reagan – 1986 – President of the United States of America
 Archbishop Iakovos – 1988 – Primate of the Greek Orthodox Church of North and South America
 George W. H. Bush – 1990 – President of the United States of America
 William "Gus" Pagonis – 1992 – Lt. General
 Mary Matthews – 1992 – Philanthropist
 Paul Sarbanes – 1993 – Senator from Maryland
 William Clinton – 1996 – President of the United States of America
 Patriarch Bartholomew – 1997 – His All Holiness, Bartholomew I, Archbishop of Constantinople, New Rome, and Ecumenical Patriarch
 George W. Bush – 2002 – President of the United States of America
 Tassos Papadopoulos – 2007 – President of Cyprus
 Costas Karamanlis – 2007 – Prime Minister of Greece
 George A. Kalogridis – 2014 – President Walt Disney World Resort
 Joe Biden – 2015 – Vice-president of the United States of America
 John Boehner – 2015 – Speaker of the House of Representatives
 Philip Christopher – 2019 – President of the International Co-ordinating Committee "Justice for Cyprus"
 Michael Psaros - 2019 - Co-founder and Managing Partner of KPS Capital Partners
 Nicos Anastasiades - 2021 - President of the Republic of Cyprus
 Kyriakos Mitsotakis - 2021 - Prime Minister of the Hellenic Republic 
 Panos Costa Panay - 2022 - Chief product officer of Microsoft,

George E. Paraskevaides O.B.E. Philanthropic Award
Past recipients include:
 George Paraskevaides (2006)

Pericles Award
The Order of AHEPA developed the Pericles award on both the National and District level to honor those individuals in Government.
Past national recipients include:
 Senator Paul Tsongas
 Senator Paul Sarbanes
 Senator John Glenn
 Congressman Mike Bilirakis
 Congressman Gus Bilirakis
 Congressman Gus Yatron
 Congressman George Gekas
 Efthimios E. Mitropoulos
 Congressman John Lewis – 2015
 Congressman Peter J. Visclosky – 2016
 Panos Kammenos – Minister of Defense of the Hellenic Republic – 2017

Also several United States Governors have been honored with this award as have many local government officials.

Solon Award

This national award is given to a member of the bar for excellence in the field of law.

 Honorable Charles P. Kocoras – 2016

Homer Award
This is a special award to be presented only by the Supreme Lodge at their discretion to any outstanding individual.

Past recipients:
 Dr. Mary Lefkowitz, Andrew Mellon Professor of Humanities, Wellesley College
 Nicholas Gage – Author
 Thea Halo – Author

Aristotle Award
This award is to be presented by the Supreme Lodge at the Grand Banquet of the Supreme Convention to an Outstanding Hellene who has distinguished himself in his respective profession or field of endeavor.

 Yiannakis Matsis (2012) – Member of the European Parliament
 Robert W. Peck (2015) – Canadian Ambassador to Greece
 Theofanis Economidis (2015)
 John P. Calamos (2016)
 Michael Zampelas (2016) - Founder and CEO of Coopers & Lybrand in Cyprus and Athens, Greece
 Timothy P. Tassopoulos (2017) – President and Chief Operating Officer of Chick-fil-A

Public Service Award
An award developed for recognition of members both national and local for their devotion and hard work in the field of public service.

Academy of Achievement Awards
These awards were funded by the Educational Foundation to honor individuals who excel in various areas of expertise. Awards can be given in the fields of business, journalism, the arts, science, and other liberal sciences.

 Efthyvoulos Paraskevaides – Academy of Achievement in Business (2010)
 Photos Photiades – Academy of Achievement in Business (2011)
 Rev. Dn. Chris Avramopolos – Academy of Achievement in Community Service (2016)
 Eleni Bousis – Academy of Achievement in Philanthropy (2016)
 Basile Katsikis – Academy of Achievement in Arts (2016)

Archbishop Iakovos Humanitarian Award
This award was developed to honor the Archbishop of North and South America who was an active and vocal member of the AHEPA. Archbishop Iakovos helped define a generation of Orthodox faithful in the Americas.  His vision and support of Human rights and compassion are a testament to his being a unique life force for all. This award is given to those individuals who surpass any standard of giving in support of Human rights and freedom.

List of recipients:
 Andrew A. Athens – Global Hellenic Diaspora Leader
 Eugene Rossides – American Hellenic Institute Founder
 Andrew S. Natsios – Former USAID Administrator
 George Behrakis – Businessmen/Philanthropists
 George Marcus – Businessmen/Philanthropists
 B'nai B'rith International – First organization to receive the award (2014)
 Stavros Niarchos Foundation (2015)

Medal of Freedom/Military Medal of Honor
Awarded to active and retired members of the military in honor of their service to their country.

This award was developed to honor those individuals who sacrifice their lives or put their lives in harm's way in executing their duty.  After the tragic events of 9/11 this award was created and awarded to the brave first responders.  Additionally, this award is also reserved for any individual who sacrifices his or her own safety for those of others.

 Col. Alan C. Macaulay (2015)
 Lt General Ilias Leontaris (2019) - Chief Cyprus National Guard

Demosthenes Award
An award developed exclusively for those individuals who excel in the area of broadcasting or reporting the news, in any form.  Television and or radio news personalities and other such journalists are eligible for this award.

Hellenism Award
This award is bestowed in recognition of an individual's lifetime outstanding support and promotion of Hellenism.

Dr. Spiro Spireas, Ph.D. (2018)
Demosthenes Vasiliou (2018)

Defender of Hellenism Award
This award is bestowed in recognition of an individual's outstanding support of and global impact on Hellenic issues of concern.
George G. Horiates, AHEPA Past Supreme President (2021)

Lifetime Achievement Award
This award is bestowed exclusively by the Supreme President of the Order of AHEPA on a member of the Order for a lifetime of achievement in the Order of AHEPA.

 Gus J. James II – AHEPA Past Supreme President (2015)
 James S. Scofield – AHEPA Past Supreme President (2016)
 George Rigos – Founder of the Odyssey Charter School (OCS)(2018)
 Craig S. Clawson - AHEPA Board of Auditors, Parliamentarian (2021)
 Lee J. Millas - AHEPA Board of Trustees Past Chair (2022)
 Anthony Kouzounis - AHEPA Past Supreme President (2022)

AHEPAN of the Year
The AHEPAN of the Year award is in recognition of outstanding leadership, devoted services, and unselfish contributions toward the advancement of the programs and progress of the Order of AHEPA over an AHEPA fiscal year.

All National AHEPA awards are awarded by the AHEPA Supreme Lodge and are reviewed and the criterion is always changing as dictated by the times by the AHEPA Supreme Lodge.

Athletics
In 1970, the AHEPA athletic program took form. AHEPA athletics include: softball, golf, bowling, basketball, with regional and national tournaments held annually. Each year, at the Supreme Convention, inductions are made into the AHEPA Hellenic Athletic Hall of Fame.

In 1975, the Order of AHEPA, at the suggestion of Past Supreme President, Louis Manesiotis and through the leadership of Supreme Athletic Director Dr. Monthe N. Kofos, established the AHEPA Athletic Hall of Fame to honor outstanding Hellenic athletes and sports personages. As of 2013, 130 members have been inducted. Annually, a representative and diverse of  Ahepans appointed by the Supreme Athletic Director select worthy and eligible candidates for induction, after a nomination process pursuant to established written guidelines for both nomination and selection. The hallmarks of said process are objectivity, transparency and accountability.

Categories of selection
There are two categories of selection;
 ATHLETES who have excelled in their particular field of play, being eligible after the passage of three (3) years from the end of their playing days (retirement); and
 CONTRIBUTORS, being individuals who have contributed in some fashion to the field of athletics; for example, athletic directors, Coaches, Supporters and Media Personalities.

Formal induction into the AHEPA Athletic Hall of Fame is accomplished annually at the annual AHEPA Supreme National Convention during the Athletic Awards Luncheon.

AHEPA is honored to recognize Hellenes of outstanding athletic accomplishment. The AHEPA ATHLETIC HALL OF FAME serves to memorialize these individuals and recognize their outstanding achievements.

Eligibility and nomination process
 A nominated candidate must be of Hellenic descent.
 Nominated candidate was considered exemplary in their particular sport or athletic field. (Criteria as set forth in the guidelines includes both accomplishments and good character)
 Nominated candidate needs to be nominated by an AHEPAN, supported by his chapter, and accompanied by the completion of the appropriate nomination forms attached hereto.
 A current photograph (head shot) of the candidate, as well as an action shot (if applicable), is requested.
 Once the nomination application is received, it is reviewed by the selection committee, and determined is thereafter included on the selection ballot.

AHEPA Athletic Hall of Fame

AHEPA athletics recognizes outstanding athletic achievements in many ways. AHEPA athletics department award scholarships to deserving scholar-athletes who have demonstrated outstanding achievements both in the classroom and the athletic fields. The funds are available through the athletic booster trust fund established through the donations of individuals.

AHEPA hosts many regional and national tournaments in sports such as golf, bowling, basketball, and softball. Winners of the tournaments are awarded in many cases free travel to the national tournament during the Supreme convention.

The most prestigious AHEPA athletic award is the Harry Agganis Hellenic Athlete Award, which is awarded annually to the outstanding Hellene in the field of athletics professional or amateur of college level and above.

Harry Agganis Award winners

Structure
The AHEPA Family consists of four organizations, the AHEPA (men), Daughters of Penelope (women), Sons of Pericles (young men) and Maids of Athena (young women). AHEPA publishes The AHEPAN, which is the second largest Greek American publication in circulation. The American Hellenic Educational Progressive Association also maintains ties with the similar Australasian Hellenic Educational Progressive Association.

The order of AHEPA consists of Chapters, Districts, and the Supreme Lodge.

Chapters

Any organization of men, but no fewer than ten, which individually and collectively, shall have duly petitioned for and received a Charter from the Supreme Lodge and which, thus Chartered and authorized, is functioning under the name and style of AHEPA, or its corporate name, shall be deemed to be a Chapter of the Order of AHEPA, and subject to its jurisdiction.

At the chapter level, the main officer positions are:
 President
 Vice-president
 Secretary
 Treasurer
 Chaplain
 Warden
 Captain of the Guard

In addition, a chapter may also have the following officer positions:
 Vice-president/Director of Hellenism
 Vice-president/Director of Education
 Vice-president/Director of Philanthropy
 Vice-president/Director of Civic Responsibility
 Vice-president/Director of Family and Individual Excellence
 Inside Sentinel
 Outside Sentinel
 Athletic Director

The chapter also has a Board of Governors composed of a chairman and a number of Governors selected in accordance with the number of members for whom per capita assessment has been paid to AHEPA Headquarters.

Number of Governors Based on Chapter Size:
 10-25 Members 2 Governors
 26-100 Members 4 Governors
 101-200 Members 6 Governors
 201-300 Members 8 Governors
 301-400 Members 10 Governors
 401-500 Members 12 Governors
 501 and up Members 14 Governors

The Officers of a Chapter shall serve for a term of twelve (12) months, or until their successors are elected and
qualified.

All AHEPA Chapters report to a specific District.

Districts

The Chapters within the jurisdiction of this Order may be organized by the Supreme Lodge into twenty-eight (28) Districts. Each District shall bear an individual name and number. Each District shall have a minimum of three (3) active Chapters. The Chapters in a District with less than three (3) active Chapters will be assigned by the Supreme Lodge to another District or Districts. The Supreme Lodge shall fix the boundaries of each District.

At the District level, the main officer positions are:
 District Governor
 Lieutenant Governor
 District Secretary
 District Treasurer
 District Marshal
 District Warden
 District Athletic Director

In addition, a District may also have the following officer positions:
 Vice-president/Director of Hellenism
 Vice-president/Director of Education
 Vice-president/Director of Philanthropy
 Vice-president/Director of Civic Responsibility
 Vice-president/Director of Family and Individual Excellence

Each and every District of the Order shall hold a District Convention annually during the months of May, June, or July. The specific time, date and place for succeeding District Conventions may be chosen by the District Convention not more than two (2) years in advance. The Order of AHEPA in Canada may hold the District Conventions not later than the first week in August.

The Conventions of each District shall be composed of duly elected Delegates of the respective Chapters composing the District and the District Officers thereof, and the immediate retiring District Governor. All Past District Governors of any District in the AHEPA Domain may vote and have a sovereign vote provided that they are members in good standing of a Chapter of that District.

The District Conventions of the Order of AHEPA shall have power and authority to:
 ALL MATTERS: Consider and discuss all matters affecting the affairs of the Order in the District;
 LEGISLATION: Adopt such legislation as the Delegates may deem necessary and proper for the welfare of the District, provided that such legislation does not in any way conflict with the AHEPA CONSTITUTION and AHEPA BYLAWS and decrees of the Supreme Convention of the Order;
 DECISIONS: Decide any and all things necessary and proper for the advancement of the District;
 RESOLUTIONS: Pass resolutions and transmit them to the Supreme Convention through the District Governor; and
 APPROPRIATE FUNDS: To appropriate monies had or to be had in the District Treasury, prescribe the manner and purposes of and for which such appropriations shall be used and designate the Officer or Officers who are to disburse the same.

List of districts
 MOTHER LODGE DISTRICT NO. 1: All Chapters within the states of Georgia, Alabama, South Carolina, Tennessee, and Mississippi.
 CITRUS DISTRICT NO. 2: All Chapters within the state of Florida, Puerto Rico and in Nassau, Bahamas.
 CAPITAL DISTRICT NO. 3: All Chapters within the states of North Carolina, Virginia, Maryland, District of Columbia and the Chapter of Bluefield, West Virginia.
 POWER DISTRICT NO. 4: All Chapters within the state of Pennsylvania, excepting Sharon-Farrell.
 GARDEN DISTRICT NO. 5: All Chapters within the state of New Jersey and Wilmington, Delaware.
 EMPIRE DISTRICT NO. 6: All Chapters within the State of New York.
 YANKEE DISTRICT NO. 7: All Chapters within the states of Connecticut and Rhode Island, and the Chapter of Pittsfield, Massachusetts.
 BAY STATE DISTRICT NO. 8: All Chapters within the State of Massachusetts, excepting the Chapter at Pittsfield.
 NORTHERN NEW ENGLAND DISTRICT NO. 9: All Chapters within the states of Maine, New Hampshire, and Vermont.
 AUTOMOTIVE DISTRICT NO. 10: All Chapters within the state of Michigan.
 BUCKEYE DISTRICT NO. 11: All Chapters within the states of Ohio, Kentucky, and the Chapters at Weirton, Huntington, Wheeling, Clarksburg and Charleston, West Virginia, and Sharon-Farrell, Pennsylvania.
 HOOSIER DISTRICT NO. 12: All Chapters within the state of Indiana.
 BLUE RIBBON DISTRICT NO. 13: All Chapters within the states of Illinois, Wisconsin.
 GRAINFIELDS DISTRICT NO. 14: All Chapters within the states of Iowa, Minnesota, North Dakota, South Dakota, all of Nebraska (excepting Bridgeport, Nebraska), and the St. Louis, Missouri Chapter No. 53.
 DELTA DISTRICT NO. 16: All Chapters within the states of Louisiana, Texas, Oklahoma, Arkansas, and all the Chapters in Kansas City, Missouri.
 SILVER DISTRICT NO. 17: All Chapters within the states of New Mexico, Wyoming, Montana, Utah, and Colorado, the Chapters in Ely, Nevada, and Bridgeport, Nebraska.
 EL CAMINO REAL DISTRICT NO. 20: All Chapters within the state of Arizona, Hawaii, and in the city and south of Bakersfield, California; and Chapters in Henderson and Las Vegas, Nevada.
 GOLDEN GATE DISTRICT NO. 21: All Chapters north and exclusive of Bakersfield in California, and the Chapter at Reno, Nevada.
 FIREWOOD DISTRICT NO. 22: All Chapters in the states of Oregon and Washington, and Alaska. 
 BEAVER DISTRICT NO. 23: All Chapters in the Provinces of Quebec, Ontario, Newfoundland, Nova Scotia, Prince Edward Islands, and New Brunswick, Canada.
 ROYAL CANADIAN DISTRICT NO. 24: All Chapters in Provinces of Alberta, Saskatchewan and Manitoba, Canada.
 HELLAS DISTRICT NO. 25: All Chapters situated within Greece.
 CANADIAN DISTRICT NO. 26: All Chapters in the Province of British Columbia, Canada.
 CYPRUS DISTRICT NO. 27: All Chapters situated within Cyprus.
 EUROPEAN DISTRICT NO. 28: All Chapters situated in Europe except for Cyprus and Greece.

Regions

AHEPA also has Regions. There are ten Regions defined by the Order of AHEPA. Each Region is divided into a set of active districts. Each Region also has an elected Supreme Governor who makes up part of the Supreme lodge.

The ten Regions are:
 Region 1 – Districts 1 and 2. Alabama, Florida, Georgia, Mississippi, South Carolina, Tennessee
 Region 2 – Districts 3 and 4. West Virginia, DC, Maryland, North Carolina, Pennsylvania, Virginia
 Region 3 = Districts 5 and 6. Delaware, New Jersey, New York
 Region 4 = Districts 7, 8 and 9. Connecticut, Maine, Massachusetts, New Hampshire, Rhode Island, Vermont
 Region 5 = Districts 10 and 11. Kentucky, Michigan, Ohio, West Virginia, except Bloomfield WV
 Region 6 = Districts 12, 13 and 14. Illinois, Indiana, Iowa, Minnesota, North Dakota, South Dakota, Wisconsin, E. Nebraska, E. Missouri
 Region 7 = Districts 15, 16 and 17. Arkansas, Colorado, Kansas, Louisiana, W. Missouri, W. Nebraska, New Mexico, Oklahoma, Texas, Wyoming, Idaho, Montana, Utah, except Salt Lake City
 Region 8 = Districts 20, 21 and 22. Idaho, Montana, Alaska, Arizona, California, Hawaii, Nevada, Oregon, Washington, Utah
 Region 9 = Districts 23, 24 and 26. Canada:  Maritimes, Quebec Ontario (23) Manitoba, Saskatchewan, Alberta (24) British Columbia (26)
 Region 10 = Districts 25, 27 and 28. Greece, Cyprus and the rest of Europe

Supreme Lodge

The "Supreme Lodge" of this Order shall be composed of the following Supreme Officers:
 Supreme President
 Supreme Vice President
 Canadian President
 Supreme Secretary
 Supreme Treasurer
 Supreme Counselor
 Nine Supreme/Regional Governors

See also
 AHEPA University Hospital

References

External links

 
 History of the Order of AHEPA
 Leber, George J. History of the Order of AHEPA 1922 - 1972. Washington DC, Order of AHEPA, 1972
 Daughters of Penelope Website
 Sons of Pericles Website
 Maids of Athena Website
American Hellenic Educational Progressive Association (AHEPA), National Office records at the Immigration History Research Center Archives, University of Minnesota Libraries

Dupont Circle
Foreign policy political advocacy groups in the United States
Organizations based in Washington, D.C.
Organizations established in 1922
Greece–United States relations
Greek-American culture
Ethnic fraternal orders in the United States